Combes may refer to:

Places
 Combes, Hérault, a commune in Hérault, France
 Combes, Switzerland, a former municipality that merged with Le Landeron in 1875
 Combes, Texas, United States

People
 Charles Combes (1801–1872), French engineer
 Émile Combes (1835–1921), French statesman and one of the originators of the concept of Separation of Church and State
 Laura Combes (1953–1989), American bodybuilder
Françoise Combes (born 1952), French astrophysicist
 Michel Combes, (born 1962), French business executive

See also
 3446 Combes, a minor planet
 Les Combes, a commune in Bourgogne-Franche-Comté, France
 Combs (disambiguation)